The Treaty of The Hague (also known as the Treaty of Den Haag) may refer to:
 Treaty of The Hague (1433)—transferred Dutch territories of Jacqueline, Countess of Hainaut, to the Duke of Burgundy
 Treaty of The Hague (1603)
 Treaty of The Hague (1608)—France and the United Provinces of the Netherlands
 Treaty of The Hague (1625)—England and the Netherlands agreed to support Christian IV of Denmark economically
 Treaty of The Hague (1641)—the Dutch Republic and the Kingdom of Portugal established a truce and sign a Treaty of Offensive and Defensive Alliance
 Concert of The Hague (1659)—also First Concert of The Hague: Dutch Republic, England and France agree on a common stance regarding the Dano-Swedish conflict in the Second Northern War
 Treaty of The Hague (1661)—the Dutch Empire recognized Portuguese imperial sovereignty over Recife in Brazil
 Treaty of The Hague (1673)—defensive alliance between the Dutch and the Holy Roman Empire, Brandenburg-Prussia and Spain against France
 Treaty of The Hague (1698)—attempted to resolve the issue of who would inherit the Spanish throne (also known as the First Partition Treaty).
 Treaty of The Hague (1701)—England, Austria, the United Provinces, and the Holy Roman Empire established an alliance in order to keep France in check.
 Treaty of The Hague (1709)—also known as the first Barrier Treaty
 Concert of The Hague (1710)—also Second Concert of The Hague: the Holy Roman Emperor, England and the Dutch Republic agree on the neutrality  of the Swedish provinces in Germany during the Great Northern War
 Treaty of The Hague (1720)—ended the War of the Quadruple Alliance
 Treaty of The Hague (1794)—between Great Britain, Netherlands and Prussia against France
 Treaty of The Hague (1795)—the Batavian Republic ceded territories to France
 Treaty of The Hague (1818)—between Great Britain and the Netherlands regarding prevention of the slave trade
 Treaty of The Hague (1895)—established the boundaries of British New Guinea
 Treaty of The Hague (1949)—granted independence from the Netherlands to Indonesia
 Treaty of The Hague (1983)—a plan for the Netherlands to grant independence to Aruba, later shelved

See also
 List of treaties
 Hague Agreement (disambiguation)
 Hague Convention (disambiguation)
 Hague Tribunal (disambiguation)